Petra van Heijst (born December 31, 1984 in Enschede) is a Dutch softball player, who represents the Dutch national team in international competitions. Her brother Frank is a baseballer in the Dutch Hoofdklasse.

Van Heijst played for Tex Town Tigers, Amsterdam Pirates and since 2005 for Terrasvogels. She is a shortstop, second baseman and outfielder who bats and throws right-handed. She competes for the Dutch national team since 2004. In 2007 she was named MVP of the Dutch Softball Hoofdklasse. She is part of the Dutch team for the 2008 Summer Olympics in Beijing.

External links
 Van Heijst at dutchsoftballteam.com

References

1984 births
Living people
Dutch softball players
Olympic softball players of the Netherlands
Softball players at the 2008 Summer Olympics
Sportspeople from Enschede